The Waputik Icefield is located on the Continental divide in the Canadian Rocky Mountains, in the provinces of British Columbia and Alberta. It is developed on the heights of the Waputik Range in the Central Main Ranges.

The icefield is shared by Banff and Yoho National Parks and numerous outlet glaciers extend from the icefield. Runoff from the Waputik Icefield provides water for numerous lakes, streams and rivers including Hector Lake, and the Bow, Kicking Horse and Yoho Rivers.  Runoff from the Daly Glacier feeds Takakkaw Falls.

The icefield is easily accessible by mountaineers in both the summer and winter.  Both ski trips in the winter and glacier hiking trips in the summer often combine a traverse of this icefield with a trip across the Wapta Icefield directly to the north.

Glaciers
The following glaciers are part of this icefield:
Waputik Glacier
Diableret Glacier
Glacier des Poilus
Emerald Glacier
Bath Glacier
Niles Glacier
Balfour Glacier
Daly Glacier

Huts
There are two huts operated by the Alpine Club of Canada which are accessible from this icefield:
Scott Duncan Hut
Balfour Hut

See also
List of glaciers

References

External links

Banff National Park
Ice fields of Alberta
Ice fields of British Columbia
Canadian Rockies
Yoho National Park